Reynoldsburg is an unincorporated community in Johnson County, Illinois, United States. Reynoldsburg had a post office from 1860 to 1879.

References

Unincorporated communities in Johnson County, Illinois
Unincorporated communities in Illinois